Gabriel Knight 3: Blood of the Sacred, Blood of the Damned is a point-and-click adventure game, developed and published by Sierra Studios for Microsoft Windows, and released in 1999. The sequel to 1995's The Beast Within: A Gabriel Knight Mystery and the third title in the Gabriel Knight series, the game's story focuses on the lives of Gabriel Knight, an author who is descended from a family that combats supernatural evils, and Grace Nakimura, a student who assists Gabriel, as they become engaged in a case that involves tracking down a kidnapped infant by vampires that is connected to the Holy Grail and Jesus. The setting is based on a real-life conspiracy theory about a hidden treasure, and involves elements of history and myths surrounding the Grail, vampires, and the Knights Templar.

Unlike previous installments, the game was fully rendered in 3D with a far greater level of puzzle solving and exploration, and featured a score that expanded upon some of the piece used in previous titles. Due to a return to animated scenes, Tim Curry returned to reprise his role as the voice actor for Gabriel; the character of Grace was recast a second time. The game was the last to be published by Sierra in the wake of the crash of the adventure video game industry, but was not a commercial success as its predecessors. It however managed to receive mainly positive reviews from critics, with two of its puzzles receiving polarising feedback on their construction – one for being frustrating, the other for being well crafted.

The game was released as part of Sierra's Best Seller Series in 2001, and re-released for GOG.com in 2010, and Steam in 2016.

Gameplay 

Blood of the Sacred, Blood of the Damned is a point-and-click adventure game, played from a third-person perspective. The story is divided into chapters that cover a three-day period of several time blocks, which play out in a linear fashion and places players in control of one of the two playable characters – while Gabriel handles the initial block of chapters, most alternate between him and Grace. In each chapter, players must complete a set of required actions in order to progress the story, but may do so in a non-linear fashion, allowing them to explore locations and conduct optional actions that provide background and context to the game's story and events. In some chapters, completing certain actions will causes changes during that chapter in other locations - these are indicated by the sound of a ticking clock. Each chapter features a variety of locations that the player can visit, some of which are accessed via an overhead map which uses a hint system to highlight key locations that have actions to be performed for that chapter; additional sites become available as the game progresses. As with Sierra games of the time, a running score is used to keep check on actions, both required and optional, that players have completed (i.e. acquiring an object needed for a puzzle).

Interactive objects are highlighted when the cursor is moved over them, to which doing so activates an action bar of "verb" commands that can be conducted by the player. Actions can involve things such as examining an object/person, picking up an item, or talking to a person. As with previous titles, players store items collected in an inventory, and can examine them, use them, combine them, or make them an active object for interactions with other items or people. Conversations with people range from those who provide brief words on things and those who need to be interviewed on topics. For interviews concerning questioning someone for information, an action bar of "verb" topics appears, which can range from asking about a place or object, learning about the person themselves, or questioning them on something they learnt. However, conversations cannot be reviewed after they have been done, as with previous games in the series.

Blood of the Sacred, Blood of the Damned allows players to have full control over the camera's positioning and angle, allowing them to examine a location in detail; the camera is only fixed during cutscenes, close-up shots of objects, and conversations. In addition, if the player's character is not in view, they will spawn someone off-camera near to the current position of the viewpoint. At certain points in the game, players can make use of a laptop for scanning in and comparing evidence, conducting research on topics, linking evidence and items to marked down suspects, and for tackling one of the game's central puzzles. In some situations, the player must overcome a dangerous situation or risk occurring a game-over moment, forcing them to retry, restart the game, or restore a previous save.

Story

Setting 
Blood of the Sacred, Blood of the Damned takes place within a world where supernatural forces, both good and evil, have existed throughout human history, with any becoming a threat to humanity being combatted by people who specialize in fighting such powers. The story is inspired by the conspiracy theory from the 1950s and 60s surrounding a hidden treasure discovered by the 19th-century parish priest Bérenger Saunière and hidden in the region around the village of Rennes-le-Château in southern France. As such, the plot not only incorporates this with a fictional theory surrounding such a treasure, but also incorporates the mythology of the Holy Grail and vampires, the myths surrounding the Knights Templar, and the religious stories of Jesus Christ before and during his crucifixion. The locations involved in the game included a fictionalized layout for Rennes-le-Château – which faithfully recreates local landmarks such as the Church of Saint Mary Magdalene - the village of Rennes-les-Bains, and a number of local landmarks accompanied by a few fictional ones.

Plot 
Four years after the events in Munich, novelist Gabriel Knight continues to maintain his role as a "Schattenjäger" ("shadow hunter") – a role his ancestors have assumed in combatting supernatural evils – with the aid of his research partner Grace Nakimura, whom he is fond of but fears making a commitment to her. While looking for material to write a new book following the success of his last novel, the pair receive an invite from Prince James of Albany, a descendant of the House of Stuart, to visit him at his home in Paris. Upon accepting it, the pair learn that James requires a Schattenjäger to protect his infant son Charlie from "Night Visitors" – vampires that have plagued the family. Gabriel agrees to the request, but on their first night watching over the infant, a strange force incapacitates the pair and allows two strange men to abduct Charlie. When Gabriel recovers, he pursues after the kidnappers to a train, but loses them when it stops outside the town of Couiza. A station porter helps Gabriel to secure a room at a hotel in the village of Rennes-le-Château.

The next morning, Gabriel calls James to report his location, and receives instructions to investigate what happened to the kidnappers before he is to be replaced by some of James' men. When seeking coffee in the hotel's dining room, Gabriel encounters his old friend Franklin Mosely, a police detective from New Orleans, who explains that he is on vacation with a treasure-hunting tour group. When Gabriel has a private meeting with him in his room, he confides in him about his new case and learns that the group arrived on the same night as he did. While exploring the village and the surrounding area, Gabriel learns the kidnappers drove towards Rennes-le-Château in a black car, and recalls that they mentioned about the Holy Grail in French. When Hames' men arrive with Grace that evening, Gabriel tails them, witnessing them have a heated conversation with a local priest, and a mysterious meeting with local British scholar Larry Chester. Both he and Grace determine that the region's treasure, the Holy Grail and the kidnapping are connected, and opt to continue investigating despite James' instructions.

The next day, Grace decides to investigate more about the region's hidden treasure, and joins the tour group. After visiting a number of sites and having lunch at a local winery, the group come across the brutally murdered bodies of James' men. When Gabriel visits the crime scene to find out more, he receives disturbing visions showing that the men were killed by vampires and drained of their blood. Although suspicious of the tour group and Larry, Grace suggests that he also meet the winery's owner, viticulturist Excelsior Montreaux, after raising concerns that there was something unnatural with him. Meanwhile, Grace continues her work into investigating the treasure and comes across an envelope containing Le Serpent Rouge – a document she overheard about on the tour, said to contain clues to locating the treasure – and begins work on deciphering some of its riddles. Later that night, Gabriel shadows Larry from his house, and witnesses him burying a manuscript detailing bloodlines connected to Jesus Christ. When he returns to the hotel, a disturbing nightmare causes Gabriel to overcome his fear, leading to him sleeping with Grace.

On the third day, Grace resumes her work into Le Serpent Rouge, and eventually deciphers it completely to reveal that underneath the region is a hidden temple, identifying where it can be entered. Meanwhile, Gabriel concludes that the tour group are unconnected to the kidnapping, with Franklin, despite being disgusted to learn of what he did with Grace, revealing that he is on attachment to CIA, investigating secret societies in the region, with two others in the group investigating the area due to heightened interest by outside parties. After meeting with James and his manservant Mesmi, who arrive in Rennes-le-Château, Gabriel determines that the kidnappers work for Montreaux, after he is forced to flee from his winery when he finds the kidnapper's car in a garage. During that time, Grace discovers Mesmi meeting with a member of the tour, Middle-Easterner tourist Emilio Baza. When she meets with Emilio, she learns that he had been discreetly helping the pair in their investigations.

When Gabriel returns, he, Franklin and Grace discover the motive for the kidnapping. Centuries ago, a brotherhood of men called the Magi provided aid and protection to Jesus during his life. However, when he was crucified, a rogue group sought to secure his blood for their own end, becoming vampires as a result, and hounding the children that he had. The Magi opted to prevent this, with Emilio fearing that Montreaux is likely to drain Charlie of his blood to become powerful. To prevent this, Gabriel, Franklin and Mesmi – who is revealed to be a Magi – head to the hidden temple where the infant is being held, while Grace and Emilio offer assistance via radio. While the three men traverse the temple's traps, Emilio confides in Grace he is immortal, having drunk some of Jesus' blood during his crucifixion after feeling his beliefs in the messiah had been betrayed. Regretting his actions, he swore not to use his powers, becoming the "Wandering Jew" and intends to remove the temple's treasure to a safer location.

Reaching the temple's inner most chamber, Gabriel confronts Montreaux as Franklin and Mesmi deal with his vampires. After a difficult fight, Gabriel kills Montreaux and rescues Charlie. Curious of the treasure, Gabriel examines it, and receives a vision that explains how his family became Schattenjägers. As Emilio leaves, he advises Grace to find her own destiny and not allow her path to be blocked. Upon his arrival at the temple, Gabriel and Franklin watch him remove the treasure – a mysterious, glowing body – and disappear. When they return to the hotel, Gabriel finds Grace has gone, having left behind a note for him, which he throws away.

Development 
Jane Jensen began designing Gabriel Knight 3 in December 1996. By the time work began on Blood of the Sacred, Blood of the Damned, it was already clear to the development team that it would be the final Gabriel Knight game. Jane Jensen remarked that "we were the last dinosaur on the block. We had until the game shipped, and then it would be over". Nonetheless, Sierra felt the series should move to 3D graphics to keep up with the times. The development team had little experience with or understanding of the format; when programmer Scott Bilas was brought on board mid-production, he was told that the game was nearly finished, only to find that the team had left out a number of features that were needed to make the game playable. The game was announced in mid-August 1997.

The team's struggles with the technology led to a number of delays. Alluding to an infamous puzzle early in the game in which Knight must use tape to get hair from a cat and use it to make a fake mustache, Bilas recalled: "It was terrible! There was something that Jane [Jensen] wanted to do that was just too hard, too expensive, too complicated to make it happen. I think our producer came up with the cat puzzle [as a replacement]. I'm pretty sure Jane didn't like it. None of the developers liked it, but we were really late and needed to get something in there".

Though she was satisfied by Dean Erickson's performance in the previous game, Jensen felt that Tim Curry represented the real voice of Gabriel Knight and opted to have him return to the role.

Soundtrack 
The game's score was composed by David Henry, based on themes created by the series' original composer, Robert Holmes. In every Gabriel Knight game, the popular gospel hymn "When the Saints Go Marching In" can be heard, albeit in different remixes and forms. In Gabriel Knight 3 it can be heard in the San Greal Tavern in Rennes-les-Bains.

Reception 

Gabriel Knight 3 received favorable reviews according to the review aggregation website Metacritic. Uros Jojic of IGN said the game "proves that adventure games still have some life left in them" and provides "a welcome change for the action-heavy PC market" with "[an] excellent story and well worked out plot". At the same time, he criticized Tim Curry's voice-over, as "a cold and over-exaggerated interpretation of the southern accent", and the switch to 3D which they felt "is not yet ready to depict the emotions and feelings in the way actors can". Erik Wolpaw of GameSpot attested the sentiments about Curry's "terrible acting job", calling the "fake accent and overly dramatic delivery [...] almost unbearable". The dialogue was also criticized, as were the puzzles, the latter which fortunately "get better as the story progresses". The story itself was more positively received, including "some excellent plot elements" and "fascinating" connections between fact and fiction. Dan Ravipinto of Adventure Gamers found some of the smaller puzzles "outright silly", but at the same time the vast Le Serpent Rouge "one of the best-designed puzzles in adventure gaming history". The storyline with its "interesting narratives" was called "epic in every sense of the word" and the game "ultimately a success". Jeff Lundrigan of NextGen said of the game, "It's a cliché, but: if you are really into adventure games – and one heck of a puzzle solver – man, is this a rare treat."

In May 2000, Jane Jensen remarked that the "sales of Gabriel Knight 3 were not sufficient to offset the cost of development given that we had to build a new engine."

The game was named the best computer adventure game of 1999 by Computer Games Strategy Plus and CNET Gamecenter, and was a runner-up for Computer Gaming Worlds, The Electric Playgrounds, GameSpots, PC PowerPlays, GameSpys and the Academy of Interactive Arts & Sciences' awards in this category. The staff of Computer Games wrote: "While the game does, at times, feature some klunky dialogue, over-the-top acting, and weak 3D graphics, it delivers a compelling universe, one that's well-realized and filled with detail".

In 2011, Adventure Gamers listed it as the 32nd-best adventure game ever released.

References

External links 
 Official website via Internet Archive
 Product page at Sierra.com via Internet Archive
 
 
 
 Demo version at Internet Archive

1999 video games
Adventure games
Gabriel Knight
Freemasonry in fiction
Holy Grail in fiction
Point-and-click adventure games
Priory of Sion hoax
Rennes-le-Château
Sierra Entertainment games
Video game sequels
Video games about vampires
Video games set in France
Windows games
Windows-only games
Video games developed in the United States